Frederick L. Woodworth (born January 18, 1877 – May 4, 1944) was a thorough-bred horse breeder, scientific farmer, and member of the Woodworth political family.

Life
Woodworth was born on January 18, 1877, in Caseville, Michigan, the son of Thomas B. Woodworth and Mary Smith. He was educated at the Michigan Agricultural College, graduating in 1893. He started farming, in which his accomplishments were noted as being the most successful representation in the county agricultural community scientifically and the premier farm in the area. He raised Jersey cattle, thorough-bred horses, and genetic-specific swine.

Woodworth was elected to the Michigan Legislature in 1909, representing Huron County, and re-elected to serve another term. In 1913, he was elected to serve as a Senator representing the 20th district, and served as the chairman of the Senate Committee on State Affairs. After serving a term, he became the Dairy and Food Commissioner for the state. In 1928, he ran unsuccessfully for the Lt. Governor seat. Woodworth would serve as the Wayne County Republican Party chairman in 1934-1935.

He served as a chairman of the Michigan State Farmers' Institute.

Marriage and children
Frederick married Gertrude Lowe, a college classmate, and they had four children:
Clara G. Woodworth
Elizabeth Woodworth
Thomas Lowe Woodworth
Mary Lowe Woodworth

Woodward died in Los Angeles, California.

References

1877 births
1944 deaths
Farmers from Michigan
Republican Party members of the Michigan House of Representatives
Republican Party Michigan state senators
People from Huron County, Michigan
Frederick
20th-century American politicians